Meadowlands is a 1996 poetry book by Louise Glück. The 80-page collection, published by Ecco, is Glück's seventh poetry collection.

Via a retelling of the Odyssey, Glück explores love through the life and deterioration of a marriage.

References

External links
 "Ceremony" from Meadowlands, reprinted November 8, 2012 in The New York Times

1996 poetry books
American poetry collections
Ecco Press books